Douglas Samuel Nikhazy (born August 11, 1999) is an American baseball pitcher in the Cleveland Guardians organization. He played college baseball for the Ole Miss Rebels.

Amateur career
Nikhazy grew up in Windermere, Florida. In eighth grade he was selected to the Under-15 United States national baseball team. Nikhazy attended West Orange High School, where he pitched and played right field on the baseball team. He committed to play college baseball at Ole Miss during his freshman year.

Nikhazy was named a freshman All-American after posting a 9-3 record and a 3.31 ERA with Ole Miss freshman record 86 strikeouts. After the season he was selected to play on the Team USA collegiate national baseball team. 3-1 record and 2.35 ERA with 31 strikeouts in four starts before the season was cut short due to the coronavirus pandemic. He was named first team All-Southeastern Conference (SEC) and was a consensus first team All-American as a junior after going 12-2 with a 2.45 ERA and 142 strikeouts over 92 innings pitched.

Professional career
Nikhazy was selected by the Cleveland Indians in the second round with the 58th overall pick of the 2021 Major League Baseball draft. On July 23, 2021, Nikhazy signed with the Indians for a $1.2 million bonus. He made his professional debut in 2022 with the Lake County Captains of the High-A Midwest League.

Personal life
In February 2020, Nikhazy was arrested in Oxford, Mississippi for driving under the influence. He was released the same night of the arrest, issued an apology, and returned to the baseball team without missing any playing time.

References

External links

Ole Miss Rebels bio

1999 births
Living people
People from Windermere, Florida
Sportspeople from Orange County, Florida
Baseball players from Florida
Baseball pitchers
Ole Miss Rebels baseball players
All-American college baseball players
Lake County Captains players